The 1964–65 National Hurling League was the 34th season of the National Hurling League.

Division 1

Tipperary came into the season as defending champions of the 1963-64 season.

On 26 September 1965, Tipperary won the title after a 6-19 to 5-20 aggregate win over New York in the final. It was their 12th league title overall and their second in succession.

In spite of finishing at the bottom of their respective groups, neither Clare or Carlow were relegated.

Tipperary's Jimmy Doyle was the Division 1 top scorer with 7-42.

Group 1A table

Group stage

Group 1B table

Group stage

Knock-out stage

Semi-finals

Home final

Finals

Tipperary won 37–35 on aggregate.

Top scorers

Top scorers overall

Top scorers in a single game

Division 2

Westmeath came into the season as defending champions of the 1963-64 season.

On 17 May 1965, Laois won the title after a 3-14 to 3-4 win over Kerry in the final.

In spite of finishing at the bottom of their respective groups, neither Down or Kildare were relegated.

Group 2C table

Group 2D table

Knock-out stage

Semi-finals

Final

References

National Hurling League seasons
Lea
Lea